Chullpa Urqu (Quechua chullpa stone tomb, burial tower, urqu mountain, "chullpa mountain", also spelled Chullpa Orkho) is a  mountain in the Bolivian Andes. It is located in the Potosí Department, Chayanta Province, Ravelo Municipality. It lies northwest of Markawi.

References 

Mountains of Potosí Department